Lai Chau may refer to:

Lai Châu, the capital city of Lai Châu Province, Vietnam
Lai Châu Province, Vietnam
Hà Đông, the former capital city of Hà Tây Province, Vietnam